WZJO may refer to:

 WZJO-LP, a low-power radio station (90.9 FM) licensed to serve Columbia, South Carolina, United States
 WYNL, a radio station (94.5 FM) licensed to serve Dunbar, West Virginia, United States, which held the call sign WZJO from 2001 to 2010